The Invereen Stone is a Class I incised Pictish stone that was unearthed near Invereen, Inverness in 1932. It is now on display at the National Museums of Scotland, Edinburgh, Scotland.

Description
It was unearthed in 1932 by a Mr. A. Dunbar near Invereen while ploughing. The stone bears a crescent and v-rod symbol and a double disc and z-rod, with a third design of a circle and line, possibly being later in date.

References

Pictish stones